Miojapyx is a genus of diplurans in the family Parajapygidae.

Species
 Miojapyx americanus Ewing, 1941

References

Diplura